Mafizuddin Ahmad was a Bengali politician and former government Minister of East Pakistan.

Early life
Ahmad was born in 1891 in Barashalghar village, Debidwar Upazila, Comilla District, Bengal Presidency, British Raj. In 1919, he graduated from University of Calcutta in English. He went to law school in Dhaka University. After graduation he started his law practice in Comilla bar, after meeting A. K. Fazlul Huq and Abul Kashem.

Personal life

Ahmad's son ABM Ghulam Mostafa served as the Minister of Energy and Natural Resources in 1988.

Career
Ahmad in 1933 joined the All India Muslim League. He was elected joint secretary of the Muslim league in Tripura District. He was elected to the Bengal Legislative assembly in 1938. He was made the parliamentary secretary for education. He was re-elected to the Bengal legislative in 1946. He was awarded the title Khan Bahadur.

After the Partition of India and establishment of Pakistan, he became the minister of  Relief, Rehabilitation, Registration, and Prisons in East Pakistan. He was appointed to the Pakistan Planning Commission in 1954. He then served as the Minister for Education in East Pakistan from 1962 to 1965. He was awarded the Sitara-i-Quaid-e-Azam by the Pakistan Government.

Death
Ahmad died in 1979.

References

All India Muslim League members
Bengali politicians
University of Dhaka alumni
Pakistani MNAs 1947–1954
People from Comilla District
Education Ministers of Pakistan
Members of the Constituent Assembly of Pakistan